Sea Palling is a village and civil parish covering  in the English county of Norfolk. The nearest railway station is at North Walsham for the Bittern Line, which runs between Sheringham, Cromer, and Norwich.

History

The Domesday Book (1086) records that Palling consisted of nine villagers and fourteen smallholders. It was surrounded by areas of salt marsh.

Its story has been inextricably linked to the sea since pre-history. The town of Waxham Parva disappeared in the sea during a storm in the thirteenth century, along with its church and some of the land that was part of the large estate of Gelham Hall. One of the earliest accounts was written by John of Oxendes, a monk at nearby St Benet's Abbey, in which he relates the destruction wrought by the great storm of 1287:the sea, agitated by the violence of the wind, burst through its accustomed limits, occupying towns, fields and other places adjacent to the coast ... it suffocated or drowned men and women sleeping in their beds, with infants in their cradles ... and it tore up houses from their foundations, with all they contained and threw them into the sea with irrevocable damage.

Three years later Palling's defenses were breached and Waxham was flooded in 1655 and 1741. The 18th century owner of Waxham, Sea Palling and Horsey, Sir Berney Brograve, unsuccessfully tried to have the sea breaches repaired after many destructive inundations of his estate by reviving a previous Act of Parliament. Lack of proper maintenance of the dunes led to continuous water breaches until a “programme of sea defence” was established in the nineteenth century. The North Sea flood of 1953 took the lives of seven villagers – some of the 100 who perished in Norfolk alone. A memorial plaque was built in St Margaret's Church. Following this tragedy, the sea wall was extended in 1986. In 1995, the Environment Agency undertook a multimillion-pound project erecting four barrier reefs. Five more reefs were later added in 1998 to make them more effective.

Historically, smuggling was an issue, which reached its peak in the mid-1770s. Revenue cutters patrolled the coast and there were seizures of tea, Geneva, and other spirits on several occasions. It is reputed that Palling was the headquarters of a band of armed smugglers. To counter this a Coastguard service was established in 1822 and a station built at Palling, which contributed to a decline in smuggling. At the same time, there was also salvage work. Local fishermen became organised into companies and bought themselves fast sailing yawls. There were two beach companies based at Palling, known locally as the Blues and the Whites. It was a perilous occupation and the demands for exorbitant payments may be excusable given the dangers involved. The companies prospered with the increase in maritime shipping and by 1838 had built brick sheds for storage and a lookout to watch over the Haisborough Sands. On 16 December 1842, one of the boats was lost with five crew and a few weeks later a yawl went down with the loss of seven crew. The impact on the village was immense, as most of the drowned were young men with families.

The coast is still hazardous and in December 1948, a steamer The Bosphorous was ensnared on the offshore Haisborough Sands and its cargo of oranges was jettisoned. To a populace emerging from the privations of war, the sight of the beaches strewn with loose and crated oranges was "miraculous" and revived another Palling custom – that of plunder. The inhabitants of 1948 could trace this pastime back for centuries when the scavengers of wrecks were known as "pawkers", despite the attempts of the Lords of the Manor to claim all shipwrecks. Perhaps the greatest coup was the wreck of Lady Agatha in 1768 with a cargo valued at £50,000 – none of which was recovered by authorities.

Away from the sea, the villagers maintained an agricultural existence.

There was also, for a time, some brick making. The bricks were transported by wherry along the New Cut to various Broadland staithes. The industry ended around the start of the 20th century and the kilns dismantled.

Sea Palling Lifeboat Station

Sea Palling Lifeboat Station is a voluntary-staffed and charitable-funded lifeboat station located in the village. First established by private funds in 1840, it was taken over by the Royal National Lifeboat Institution (RNLI) in 1858 and operated until 1931, when it was closed in a rationalisation of regional lifeboat stations. During its 91 years of service, the station had one of the best rescue records of all the lifeboat stations in the UK. In 400 launches, 795 lives had been saved, a record bettered by only three other UK stations. Crews had gained four RNLI silver gallantry medals, with a replica of the one awarded to Tom Bishop still on show at St Margaret's Church.

Revived in 1974 by local people through private funds, business and charitable donations, today the charitable Palling Voluntary Rescue Service runs a single  Ocean Pro RIB, covering the area between Eccles-on-Sea and Winterton-on-Sea. Between mid-May and mid-September each year, the RNLI maintains a lifeguard station on the beach at Sea Palling, located just below the PVRS lifeboat station.

Further reading

References

External links

 Village website
 Google Maps and Bing Maps – Aerial photo of wave diffraction through the sea barriers.

Villages in Norfolk
Populated coastal places in Norfolk
Civil parishes in Norfolk
Beaches of Norfolk
North Norfolk